William Morris Jones (30 November 1919 – 1993) was an English footballer. A centre-forward, he scored 84 goals in 191 league games in a 13-year career in the Football League.

Jones moved from South Liverpool to Port Vale in June 1939, but had to wait seven years to make his debut because of World War II. He was sold on to Swindon Town for £2,500 in November 1947. He moved on to Crystal Palace after three years, before ending his career after spending the 1951–52 season with Watford. He was listed in the September 2002 book Swindon Town Football Club 100 Greats.

Career
Jones performed well for South Liverpool in the Lancashire Combination in 1938–39, ousting the more experienced Jack Roscoe from the starting line-up. However, Jones found himself on the sidelines as South Liverpool won four trophies, including the Welsh Cup, in the spring of 1939. He signed with Port Vale in June 1939. Due to the Second World War it took until 31 August 1946, in a match against Brighton & Hove Albion, before he made his debut; in the interim he had guested four times (three times in the league) for Celtic in 1940. He scored his first Third Division South goal on 7 September, in a 2–1 defeat by Exeter City at The Old Recreation Ground. He scored a hat-trick past Watford in a 3–0 home win on 16 November, and also scored twice against Watford in the FA Cup. In total, he scored 26 goals in 44 appearances in 1946–47, becoming the club's top-scorer. He hit three goals in 14 games in 1947–48, all of the goals coming in a 6–4 win over Aldershot on 6 September.

Jones handed "Valiants" manager Gordon Hodgson a transfer request, and his wish was granted in November 1947, when he was sold to league rivals Swindon Town for £2,500. Louis Page's "Robins" finished 16th in 1947–48, with Jones scoring 14 goals in 31 games. He then hit 25 goals in 43 appearances to help the club to rise to fourth place in 1948–49. He then scored 13 goals in 27 games, as Swindon finished in 14th place in 1949–50. Jones scored 52 goals in 101 league and cup appearances during his time at the County Ground. Following a £3,500 transfer in May 1950, he scored three goals in 17 league appearances for Crystal Palace in 1950–51, as the "Eagles" finished bottom of the Third Division South. He left Selhurst Park for Watford in March 1951. Haydn Green's "Hornets" finished three places above the bottom of the Third Division South at the end of the 1951–52 campaign. Despite scoring seven goals in 27 league games for a struggling team, Jones did not find another club after leaving Vicarage Road, though did have a trial with Leyton Orient.

Career statistics
Source:

References

1919 births
1993 deaths
Footballers from Liverpool
English footballers
Association football forwards
South Liverpool F.C. players
Port Vale F.C. players
Celtic F.C. wartime guest players
Swindon Town F.C. players
Crystal Palace F.C. players
Watford F.C. players
English Football League players